"I Need a Dollar" is a song performed by American singer Aloe Blacc, written by Blacc, Leon Michels, Nick Movshon and Jeff Dynamite.

It is the intro song for the HBO show How to Make It in America, and was featured as the iTunes Single of the Week. It also featured in the game Fight Night Champion. Blacc has performed the song live on Later... with Jools Holland, The Graham Norton Show, Late Night with Jimmy Fallon, and Conan. In April 2011, it was featured in a commercial for Boost Mobile wireless services. This song also speeds up by 2bpm through it.

Music video
The standard version of the song has two music videos. The first, released in 2010, was filmed in New York, and features the screen being split in half. The right side shows Blacc singing inside an apartment while the left side shows a man walking through the streets of New York. Once Aloe enters the left side after the line "Maybe it's inside the bottle" and performs at a bar, the song changes to "Life So Hard".

The second, released in 2011, was filmed in and around Las Vegas and was directed by Derek Pike. The video shows Blacc walking alone along a highway in Nevada, and then hitching a ride to Las Vegas, where he finds a dollar coin on the casino floor, uses it to play a slot machine, and wins.

Formats and track listings
UK digital single
"I Need a Dollar" – 4:05
"I Need a Dollar" (Radio Mix) – 3:22
"I Need a Dollar" (Zinc Remix) – 5:48
"I Need a Dollar" (Blue Fear Trance Remix) – 10:49

German digital single
"I Need a Dollar" – 4:02
"I Need a Dollar" (Tensnake Remix) – 6:45
"I Need a Dollar" (M.Arfmann & Chassy Wezar RMX) – 3:27

Charts

Weekly charts

Year-end charts

Certifications

Samples and covers
Various hip-hop artists have sampled "I Need a Dollar" or freestyled over the instrumental, including Yelawolf, T.I., Wax, Dumbfoundead, Chris Webby, MGK, and Mac Miller, and Sammy Adams.

Australian artist Xavier Rudd covered "I Need a Dollar" on 'Like a Version', a segment on the Australian radio station 'Triple J'

British artists Ed Solo and Deekline together remixed "I Need A Dollar" and released it as a single with the same name.

References

External links

 

Aloe Blacc songs
2010 singles
Ultratop 50 Singles (Flanders) number-one singles
Number-one singles in Israel
Songs about poverty
2010 songs
Songs written by Aloe Blacc
Sony Music UK singles
Songs written by Nick Movshon